Stefano Pettinari (born 27 January 1992) is an Italian professional footballer who plays as an attacking midfielder or striker for Benevento on loan from Ternana.

Club career
Pettinari was born in Rome, and made his debut for Roma first team on 16 December 2009, in an UEFA Europa League game against PFC CSKA Sofia. Then he made his Serie A debut on 20 March 2010, when he came on as a substitute for Jérémy Menez in the 87th minute of the game against Udinese.

He spent the first part of the 2010–11 season on loan to Serie B club Siena, but he didn't find any occasion to play so in January 2011 he came back to Roma, where he trained with the first team.

In July 2011 he was sent on loan to Serie B club Crotone for the 2011–12 season. On 17 September 2011 he scored his first league goal in the home match won 2–1 against Empoli. In June 2012 Crotone excised the option to buy him in a co-ownership deal for €250,000. In June 2014 he returned to Roma for €500,000.

On 24 July 2015 he was signed by Vicenza. He wore no.9 shirt for 2015–16 Serie B, but on 5 September given to Nicola Pozzi. Pettinari took no.20 shirt from Srđan Spiridonović instead. On 13 January 2016 he was signed by Como on loan. He scored 2 goals in 14 appearances in the Serie B.

On 25 August 2016 he moved to Pescara, this time on a permanent basis. He made his second Serie A appearance on 19 November 2016 against Juventus at the Juventus Stadium. He played in 6 matches before being sent to Serie B club Ternana on loan in January 2017. He was a key figure in Ternana's team that managed to avoid relegation to Serie C.

Pettinari came back to Pescara at the start of the 2017–18 Serie B season and immediately gained a place in the starting line up. He scored 13 goals in 38 appearances in the Serie B and 1 goal in 2 appearances in the Coppa Italia.

On 28 June 2018 he was signed by Serie B side Lecce on a permanent basis. On 28 January 2019 he returned to Crotone on loan.

On 17 June 2020 he joined Trapani on a permanent basis.

On 13 October 2020, soon after Trapani was excluded from all professional leagues, Pettinari returned to Lecce.

On 15 July 2021, he returned to Ternana on a three-year contract. In January 2023, he joined Benevento on loan with the right to make the move permanent.

International career
He has already played for U-16, U-17 and U-19 national teams.

References

External links
 AIC profile (data by football.it) 
 
 

1992 births
Footballers from Rome
Living people
Italian footballers
A.S. Roma players
Como 1907 players
Latina Calcio 1932 players
Delfino Pescara 1936 players
L.R. Vicenza players
F.C. Crotone players
U.S. Lecce players
Ternana Calcio players
Benevento Calcio players
Serie A players
Serie B players
Italy youth international footballers
Italy under-21 international footballers
Association football midfielders